is a Japanese politician of the Democratic Party of Japan, a member of the House of Councillors in the Diet (national legislature). A native of Hachinohe, Aomori and graduate of Rikkyo University, he was elected to the House of Councillors for the first time in 2004 after serving in the Aomori Prefectural Assembly for two terms and then in the House of Representatives for six terms.

He was former head coach of Japan national ice hockey team. He also competed at the 1960 Winter Olympics and the 1964 Winter Olympics.

References

External links 
  in Japanese.
 

|-

|-

|-

1934 births
Living people
Democratic Party of Japan politicians
Government ministers of Japan
Ice hockey players at the 1960 Winter Olympics
Ice hockey players at the 1964 Winter Olympics
Japanese ice hockey players
Japanese racehorse owners and breeders
Japanese sportsperson-politicians
Members of the House of Councillors (Japan)
Members of the House of Representatives (Japan)
Members of the Aomori Prefectural Assembly
Olympic ice hockey players of Japan
People from Hachinohe
Sportspeople from Aomori Prefecture
Rikkyo University alumni